Saint Eupsychius of Caesaria in Cappadocia (died 362 AD) was a Christian martyr who was executed for having caused the destruction of a pagan temple.

History and legend

There seems to be a historical basis for the story of Eupsychius, although later writers have embellished it with hagiographical inventions.
Sozomen's Church History V:II 7-8, writing of Julian's reign (361–363), stated that Eupsychius, a newly-married nobleman of Caesarea in Cappadocia was executed for causing the destruction of the temple of Tyche.
The emperor was angry with all the citizens of Caesarea, and the participants in the temple's destruction were punished with death or exile.
Arethas of Caesarea also mentions that Eupsychius was newly married when he was martyred.

Subsequent redactions expand and embellish the basic story.
Thus the Synaxarion of Constantinople states that he was put on the rack and cruelly flogged, then an angel appeared and strengthened him. 
He was again hung on the rack and scourged so that his inner organs were exposed, then was beheaded.
Instead of blood, milk and water flowed, a strange sight for all to see.

Monks of Ramsgate account

The monks of St Augustine's Abbey, Ramsgate, wrote in their Book of Saints (1921),

Butler's account

The hagiographer Alban Butler ( 1710–1773) wrote in his Lives of the Primitive Fathers, Martyrs, and Other Principal Saints, under April 9,

Notes

Sources

 
 

Saints of medieval Greece
362 deaths